Eric R. Flaum (1961 – March 18, 1997) was an American music critic and author who wrote for several magazines, including The Bob. He later worked as production manager at Rolling Stone.

Bibliography 
Flaum wrote three books:

 The Planets: A Journey Into Space (1988)
 Discovery: Exploration Through the Centuries (1990)
 The Encyclopedia of Mythology (1995)

He also contributed to Garcia, Rolling Stone's book about the Grateful Dead.

Personal life 
Flaum was born in 1961.

He was married to Seija, with whom he had a son and a daughter.

Death 
Flaum died on Long Island, New York, in 1997, aged 35.

References 

1961 births
1997 deaths
20th-century American journalists
American male journalists
20th-century American male writers
American music critics
American music journalists
Rolling Stone people